Justice Bartlett or Judge Bartlett may refer to:

Edward T. Bartlett (1841–1910), judge of the New York Court of Appeals
Ara Bartlett (1825–after 1880), chief justice of the Supreme Court of the Dakota Territory
Josiah Bartlett (1729–1795), chief justice of the New Hampshire Superior Court 
Willard Bartlett (1846–1925), chief judge of the New York Court of Appeals